A rapid is a section of a river with turbulent water flow.

Rapid or RAPID may also refer to:

Association football clubs 
 SK Rapid Wien, an Austrian club
 FC Rapid Ghidighici, a Moldovan club
 SK Rapid, a Norwegian club
 FC Rapid București, a Romanian club
 FK Rapid Bratislava, a Slovak club
 SV Rapid Marburg, a Yugoslav former club that today would be Slovene
 Colorado Rapids, an American team

Transportation 
 Rapid (brig), the ship that brought William Light's surveying party to South Australia in 1836
 The Rapid, popular name of RTA Rapid Transit, the transit service of Cleveland and surrounding Cuyahoga County, Ohio
 The Rapid, brand name of the Interurban Transit Partnership, the transit service of the Greater Grand Rapids, Michigan area
 Rapid (San Diego), a BRT system serving the Greater San Diego region in California
 Rapid Rail, a rapid transit operator in Malaysia
 Rapid Bus, a bus operator in Malaysia
 Rapid Ferry, a ferry operator in Penang, Malaysia
 Renault Rapid, a van
 Škoda Rapid (disambiguation), several cars built by Škoda Auto
 Società Torinese Automobili Rapid, also known as Rapid, an Italian car manufacturer between 1904 and 1921

Creeks 
 Rapid Creek (Iowa River), Iowa, United States
 Rapid Creek (South Dakota), United States, namesake of Rapid City

RAPID 
 RAPID, a programming language used to control industrial robots
 Rural Address Property IDentification
 Refinery and Petrochemical Integrated Development Project, part of the Pengerang Integrated Petroleum Complex
 Rapid Advancement in Process Intensification Deployment, a Manufacturing USA research institute

See also 
 Bob Feller (1918–2010), American Hall-of-Fame baseball pitcher nicknamed "Rapid Robert"
 Rabid (disambiguation)
 Rabit (disambiguation)
 Rapit
 Rapid antigen test